A balloon-carried light effect is a special effect carried by a balloon, which can be fixed with a rope to the ground or free-flying. They are commonly misidentified as "Unidentified Flying Objects" by members of public.

Uses

Balloon-carried light effects can be used without safety concerns at events with a lot of people, because unlike fireworks they do not require the use of flammable substances. The brightness is much lower, when non-dangerous light sources such as lightsticks or battery-powered lamps are used.

Balloon-carried light effects cannot replace fireworks, but supplement them, because of their long lighting time (if lightsticks or battery powered lamps are used) and because of their inherent safety.
To realise a balloon-carried light effect, one or more balloons are used, capable of carrying a lightstick or a small battery powered lamp. Further it is possible to insert one or two small lightsticks into a transparent balloon.

It is also possible for larger balloon-carried light effects to use tethered balloons, which also can contain an electric cable power supply: these 'artificial moons' may be used for floodlighting.

Open-air concert use
Balloon-carried light effects are sometimes used on open-air concerts and similar events.  For film and event use, balloons are offered as suspended air-filled or tethered floating helium-filled. The latter for outdoors uses a 2-meter diameter balloon and 4 1000 Watt halogen tungsten lights inside, rising up about 10 m and withstanding only calm winds.

Other uses included fixed or pole balloons, spread like an umbrella, the upper half reflective coated, the lower half semi-opaque, light construction sites on highways, or accident sites in case of emergency.

Balloons (entertainment)